William Redmond may refer to:
William Redmond (Irish politician, born 1825), Irish nationalist politician, father of John Redmond
William Redmond (Irish politician, born 1886), Irish nationalist politician, son of John Redmond, British Army captain
William T. Redmond (born 1955), Republican member of the U.S. House of Representatives from New Mexico
William A. Redmond, Illinois Democratic politician
Billy Redmond or William T. Redmond, (1853–1894), St. Louis Red Stockings shortstop 
Willie Redmond or William Hoey Kearney Redmond (1861–1917), Irish nationalist politician, brother of John Redmond, British Army captain